Massimo Ferrin (born December 6, 1998) is a Canadian professional soccer player who currently plays as a forward for the HFX Wanderers of the Canadian Premier League.

Early life
Ferrin began playing youth soccer at age five with Mississauga SC. Afterwards, he played youth soccer with Vaughan Azzurri.

College career
In 2016, Ferrin began attending the University of Alabama at Birmingham, where he played for the men's soccer team. He scored his first collegiate goals on September 3, 2016, scoring twice in a 2-2 draw against the UNC Greensboro Spartans. After his freshman season, he was named to the Conference USA All-Freshman Team. After his sophomore season, he was named the team's Most Valuable Player and was named a Conference USA Second-Team All-Star. During his time at UAB, he scored eight goals in two seasons.

In 2018, he transferred to Syracuse University to play for the men's soccer team. He made his debut on August 24, 2018 against the Oregon State Beavers. He scored his first goal for Syracuse on September 7, converting a penalty kick against the Notre Dame Fighting Irish. On September 24, 2019, he scored the game-winning goal in a 1-0 victory over the Colgate Raiders. In his senior season, he was named to the All-ACC Men's Soccer Academic Team.

Club career
In 2015 and 2016, Ferrin played with League 1 Ontario side Vaughan Azzurri. He also played with the side in 2018 and 2019.

In February 2020, he signed with USL Championship side Loudoun United. He made his debut on July 20, 2020, starting against Hartford Athletic. In January 2021, he re-signed with the club for the 2021 season. On July 14, 2021, he played with D.C. United, Loudoun's MLS affiliate, in a friendly against El Salvador club Alianza, scoring the only goal in a 1-0 victory.

In 2022, he returned to Vaughan Azzurri, scoring 23 goals in 15 league games. He helped Vaughan win the league championship and he was named league MVP, won the Golden Boot, and was a First Team All-Star.

In December 2022, Ferrin joined Canadian Premier League club HFX Wanderers on a two-year contract through 2024, with an option for 2025.

International career
In 2015, he attended a camp with the Canada U18 team.

Career statistics

References

External links

1998 births
Living people
Association football forwards
Canadian soccer players
Loudoun United FC players
Soccer players from Mississauga
Syracuse Orange men's soccer players
UAB Blazers men's soccer players
USL Championship players
Vaughan Azzurri players
League1 Ontario players